Mănești is a commune in Prahova County, Muntenia, Romania. It is composed of five villages: Băltița, Coada Izvorului, Gura Crivățului, Mănești and Zalhanaua. It also included eight other villages until 2004, when they were split off to form Cocorăștii Colț Commune.

References

Communes in Prahova County
Localities in Muntenia